Andre Seymour (born 22 August 1967) is a Bahamian boxer. He competed at the 1984 Summer Olympics and the 1988 Summer Olympics. At the 1984 Summer Olympics, he lost to Oppe Pinto of Paraguay.

References

1967 births
Living people
Bahamian male boxers
Olympic boxers of the Bahamas
Boxers at the 1984 Summer Olympics
Boxers at the 1988 Summer Olympics
Place of birth missing (living people)
Featherweight boxers